Arthur Sherwood Hillhouse (June 12, 1916 – October 27, 1980) was an American professional basketball player.

A 6'7" center from Long Island University, Hillhouse played two seasons (1946–1948) in the Basketball Association of America as a member of the Philadelphia Warriors.  He averaged 5.9 points per game in his BAA career and won a league championship in 1947.  During the 1947 finals, Hillhouse set a still standing NBA record by becoming the only player to foul out of every game of a 5-game playoff series.

BAA career statistics

Regular season

Playoffs

References

External links

1916 births
1980 deaths
All-American college men's basketball players
American men's basketball players
Basketball players from New Jersey
Centers (basketball)
LIU Brooklyn Blackbirds men's basketball players
People from Rutherford, New Jersey
Philadelphia Warriors players
Rutherford High School (New Jersey) alumni
Wilkes-Barre Barons players